The following is a list of political parties in Iraq.

Iraq is a multi-party state. Political parties are commonly grouped by ideology/ethnic affiliation and by the group with which they were listed on the ballot of the 2005 Iraqi National Assembly election.

Parliamentary alliances and parties

Other parties

Al Neshoor Party
Alliance of Independent Democrats – led by Adnan Pachachi
Assyria Liberation Party
Bet-Nahrain Democratic Party
Constitutional Monarchy Movement – led by Sharif Ali Bin al-Hussein
Democratic Monarchy Alliance
Green Party of Iraq
The Upholders of the Message (Al-Risaliyun)
Iraqi Democratic Union
Rawafid El-Iraq led by Jalal B. Mejel AlGaood
Ezidi Freedom and Democracy Party (PADE)
Leftist Worker-Communist Party of Iraq
Popular Unity Party
Turkmen People's Party
Worker-Communist Party of Iraq

See also
Politics of Iraq
List of political parties by country

External links
List of political parties participating in December 2005 election
Report on Iraq's New Political Map by the United States Institute of Peace

Iraq
 
Iraq politics-related lists
Iraq
Political parties